Amphisopodidae is a family of crustaceans belonging to the order Isopoda.

Genera:
 Lakeamphisopus Knott, 1975
 Phreatomerus Sheppard, 1927

References

Isopoda